Lacedaemon (Ancient Greek: Λακεδαίμων Lakedaímōn) or Lacedemon was the eponymous king of Lacedaemon (i.e. Sparta) in classical Greek mythology.

Family 
Lacedaemon was the son of Zeus and the Pleaid Taygete. By Princess Sparta, the daughter of former King Eurotas, he was the father of his heir Amyclas and Eurydice, wife of King Acrisius of Argos.

In a rare version of the myth, Taygete was the wife of Lacedaemon and their children were Himerus and Cleodice.

Mythology 
Unable to produce a male heir, King Eurotas bequeathed the kingdom to Lacedaemon who then renamed the state after his wife, Sparta, who was also his niece. Lacedemon was credited to be the founder of the sanctuary of the Graces, Cleta and Phaenna, near the river Tiasa.

Notes

References 

 Grimal, Pierre, The Dictionary of Classical Mythology, Wiley-Blackwell, 1996. 
 Lucius Mestrius Plutarchus, Morals translated from the Greek by several hands. Corrected and revised by. William W. Goodwin, PH. D. Boston. Little, Brown, and Company. Cambridge. Press Of John Wilson and son. 1874. 5. Online version at the Perseus Digital Library.
 Pausanias, Description of Greece with an English Translation by W.H.S. Jones, Litt.D., and H.A. Ormerod, M.A., in 4 Volumes. Cambridge, MA, Harvard University Press; London, William Heinemann Ltd. 1918. . Online version at the Perseus Digital Library
 Pausanias, Graeciae Descriptio. 3 vols. Leipzig, Teubner. 1903.  Greek text available at the Perseus Digital Library.

Children of Zeus
Demigods in classical mythology
Mythological kings of Sparta
Kings in Greek mythology
Laconian characters in Greek mythology
Laconian mythology